High affinity cationic amino acid transporter 1 is a protein that in humans is encoded by the SLC7A1 gene.

See also 
 Solute carrier family

References

Further reading 

 
 
 
 
 
 
 
 
 
 
 
 
 
 

Solute carrier family